Dolores, officially the Municipality of Dolores,  is a 4th class municipality in the province of Quezon, Philippines. According to the 2020 census, it has a population of 32,514 people.

It is located at the foot of Mount Banahaw.

Geography

Barangays
Dolores is politically subdivided into 16 barangays.
 Antonino (Ayusan)
 Bagong Anyo (Poblacion)
 Bayanihan (Poblacion)
 Bulakin 1
 Bulakin 2
 Bungoy
 Cabatang
 Dagatan
 Kinabuhayan
 Maligaya (Poblacion)
 Manggahan
 Pinagdanlayan
 Putol
 San Mateo
 Santa Lucia
 Silanganan (Poblacion)

Climate

Demographics

Economy

Tourism
Bangkong Kahoy Valley Nature Retreat and Field Study Center
Lukong Valley Farms
Mount Banahaw Bee Farm
National Shrine of Our Lady of Sorrows
Del's Garden
Amara's Restobar
Latag's by Vicente
Calinga Happy Place
Paeng Falls

Notes

External links

Dolores Profile at PhilAtlas.com
[ Philippine Standard Geographic Code]
Philippine Census Information
Local Governance Performance Management System 

Municipalities of Quezon